Quinsy Gario (born 1984) is an activist in the movement against Zwarte Piet, as well as a performance artist. 

He was born in Curaçao and raised in St Maarten before moving to the Netherlands.

Gario created the project Zwarte Piet is Racisme (Black Pete is Racism) about Zwarte Piet. In 2011 he was arrested for public disturbance at the traditional annual Sinterklaas festival where he was protesting against the use of Zwarte Piet. He appeared on a national television talk show in 2013 "to make his case" which was part of a series of events in October that The Economist says "polaris[ed] cultural life and dragging in celebrities, politicians, and even the UN" and "changed Zwarte Piet". For many, even if a year ago he was not a symbol of Dutch racism, he is now."

References

1984 births
Living people
Dutch anti-racism activists
Dutch people of Curaçao descent
Sinterklaas